Geoffrey McQueen (24 July 1947 – 6 July 1994) was a British television screenwriter. He is best known for creating Thames Television's long-running police procedural The Bill and the popular comedy-dramas Give Us a Break, Big Deal and Stay Lucky.

A carpenter and joiner by trade he worked abroad for many years before he began writing in 1978. His first success was in 1982 when an episode of The Gentle Touch he had written was broadcast.

He wrote for other shows, including Boon, and two Jim Davidson sitcoms.

He died on 6 July 1994, aged 46, from an aneurysm. He was survived by his wife Jan and their two children

External links 
 

1947 births
1994 deaths
British television writers
The Bill
People from the London Borough of Hackney
20th-century British dramatists and playwrights
British male dramatists and playwrights
20th-century British male writers
British male television writers
People from Dalston
20th-century British screenwriters
Deaths from aneurysm